Inferior Decorator is a 1948 animated Donald Duck short film produced in Technicolor by Walt Disney Productions and released to theaters by RKO Radio Pictures.

Plot
Spike the bee is pollinating flowers outside Donald Duck's house in his garden. He hears Donald singing, and mistakes the wallpaper for flowers. Donald teases Spike by getting him stuck in glue before freeing him, causing the bee to hit the light; Donald pushes him outside and shuts the window. But Spike gets revenge; he removes the key from the lock and decides to sting Donald's rear end, but misses and gets stuck on the wallpaper glue. Donald tugs with the wallpaper and Spike frees himself from the glue. But this causes the wallpaper to stick to the ceiling, with Donald's hands glued in the wallpaper.

Spike sees this opportunity to sting Donald's rear end and dives right at him. But Donald evades the bee's stinger and thwarts him with a bottle cork; this fails, as Spike gets the cork off his stinger. Spike again dives at Donald and misses him. When he sees Donald hiding in the wallpaper on the ceiling, Spike cuts open the wallpaper with his stinger and exposes Donald's rear end. Spike then goes outside and whistles to the bees in the beehive, and they gather together. Spike then invites them inside the keyhole, and lets them in the house, one at a time, to sting Donald's rear end.

Voice cast
 Donald Duck: Clarence Nash

Home media
The short was released on December 11, 2007, on Walt Disney Treasures: The Chronological Donald, Volume Three: 1947-1950.

Additional releases include:
Classic Cartoon Favorites, Volume Two - Starring Donald (DVD)

References

External links

1948 short films
1948 animated films
Donald Duck short films
1940s Disney animated short films
1940s English-language films
Films scored by Oliver Wallace
Films directed by Jack Hannah
Films produced by Walt Disney
RKO Pictures short films
RKO Pictures animated short films
Films about ducks
Films about bees